The Demon Stirs is a 2005 French comedy film written and  directed by Marie-Pascale Osterrieth and starring Michèle Bernier and Simon Abkarian.

It is based on the graphic novel Le Démon de midi (1996) by Florence Cestac.

Cast 

 Michèle Bernier as Anne Cestac
 Simon Abkarian as Julien Cestac
 Mathis Arguillère as Pierre
 Hiam Abbass as Rim
 Alexandra Pandev as Alex
 Florence Viala as Maude
 Julie-Anne Roth as Claire
 Zinedine Soualem as Samir
 Toni Garrani as Nino
 Jean-Marc Bihour as Tristan
 Stéphane Hillel as Gabby
 Jean-Luc Lemoine as Raphaël
 Jérôme Pouly as Didier 
 Jean Dell as The mayor 
 Riton Liebman as The lifeguard
 Claudia Cardinale as herself

References

External links

French comedy films
2005 comedy films
2005 films
Films based on French comics
Live-action films based on comics
2000s French films